The Algerian team in its 57th year will participate in the Africa Cup of Nations for the 18th and fourth consecutive time.

Players

Current squad
 The following 23 players were selected for the friendly match against Zambia on 15 October 2019.
 Caps and goals are correct as of 15 October 2019, after the match against Botswana.

Recent call-ups
The following players have been called up to the Algeria squad at least once within the last 12 months.

INJ Player withdrew from the squad due to an injury.
RET Retired from international football.

Summary

This page summarises the Algeria national football team fixtures and results in 2019.

This year, Algeria's participation in the Africa Cup of Nations The first match was the final round of Africa Cup of Nations qualification against the Gambia and ended with a 1-1 draw, scoring the only goal for Algeria's Mehdi Abeid. to end the qualifiers in the lead with 11 points. The preparation for CAN 2019 begins with three friendlies: The first at the end of March, which ended with a victory for Les Fennecs (1-0) against Tunisia with a goal from Baghdad Bounedjah on penalty, the other two matches will be determined by the FAF after having drawn the draw for the 2019 Africa Cup of Nations. After he was scheduled to attend the national team in preparation for the Africa Cup of Nations in the UAE, the coach retreated and chose Qatar due of the preparation of both Burundi and Mali rivals Algeria before Africa Cup. first match against Burundi ended with a 1-1 draw and Bounedjah scored the goal of Algeria after a pass from Youcef Belaïli. Coach Djamel Belmadi has decided to dismiss Haris Belkebla after a video broadcast live and accessible long hours after a live stream of Fortnite on tweet account of Alexandre Oukidja and he was replaced by Andy Delort. On June 16, In the last match before heading to Egypt against Mali, Algeria won 3–2 and the new striker Delort scoring the winning goal.

With the start of the African Cup, the Algerian national team managed to achieve the full haul of nine points in Group C For the first time since 1990 in Algeria without receiving any goal, the first three points were against Kenya by 2–0 Bounedjah converted from the penalty spot after 34 minutes in Cairo following a clear foul on Youcef Atal. then Riyad Mahrez doubled the advantage with a deflected shot from Ismael Bennacer's cut-back two minutes before half-time, With this goal Mahrez became the first Algerian to score in three consecutive copies 2015, 2017 and 2019. In the second game Algeria face Senegal in a battle for top spot Youcef Belaili blasted home the only goal of the game from the edge of box from Sofiane Feghouli's cross, to clinch a place in the Africa Cup of Nations last 16, Bennacer also won Man of the Match for the second time in a row. In their last game against Tanzania, Belmadi changed the whole squad except M'Bolhi and Bennacer, and despite that they won with three goals. The first goal was scored by Islam Slimani after an assist from Adam Ounas, after which Slimani gave two decisive passes to Ounas the last with the end of the match won Man of the Match.

Algeria continued its rampant performance with a 3–0 win over Guinea in the round of 16, Belaili  took the lead after a neat one-two with Bounedjah In the second half, Mahrez added the second goal with a moment of quality, before substitute Ounas tapped in Youcef Atal's low cross from close range. but struggled harder against Ivory Coast, being held 1–1 after 120' before overcame the Ivorians 4–3 in penalty shootout After Serey Dié miss the last kick of Ivory Coast, this game saw the injury of Atal and miss the rest of the games. The Algerians then put up an outstanding performance, beating African powerhouse Nigeria 2–1, with a late minute goal by Mahrez in a free kick spot to reach their first ever final since winning at home at 1990.

Overview

International debut
Players made their international debut in 2019

1Note: Age when debuted.

Match results

Africa Cup of Nations

Group stage

Algeria vs Kenya

Senegal vs Algeria

Tanzania vs Algeria

Knockout stage

Round of 16

Quarter-finals

Semi-finals

Final

Official Squad 

Coach: Djamel Belmadi

The final squad was announced on 30 May 2019. On 13 June 2019, Andy Delort was announced as a replacement for Haris Belkebla who was excluded from the squad.

2021 CAN qualification

Group H

Squad information

Player statistics
Correct as of 18 November 2019 (v. ).
Numbers are listed by player's number in WC&CAF Qualification or last friendly played

Goalscorers
Includes all competitive matches. The list is sorted alphabetically by surname when total goals are equal.

Assists

Clean sheets
Includes all competitive matches.

Notes

References

2019
Algeria
2018–19 in Algerian football
2019–20 in Algerian football